The 2011 FIL Women's U-19 World Lacrosse Championship was the 5th FIL Women's Under-19 World Lacrosse Championship, an international field lacrosse tournament that is held every four years and is sponsored by the Federation of International Lacrosse. It took place from August 3–13, 2011 in Hanover, Germany. The games were played at Sportpark Hannover on two fields—Erika Fisch Stadium and Club Hannover 78. The American team came into the tournament as the defending champion.

Preliminary round
Ten participating teams were placed in the following two groups. After playing a round-robin, all six teams from Group A will advance to the championship round along with the top two teams from Group B. The remaining four teams in Group B will compete in the consolation round for placings nine through twelve.

Pool A 

All times are local (UTC+2).

Pool B 

All times are local (UTC+2).

Consolation round

All times are local (UTC+2).

Championship round

All times are local (UTC+2).

Quarter-finals

Consolation semi-finals

Semi-finals

7th place playoff

5th place playoff

Bronze medal game

Gold medal game

Ranking and statistics

Final standings
The final standings of the tournament according to the FIL:

All-World Team

References

External links 
Official website

2011 in German sport
2011 in lacrosse
Sports competitions in Hanover
Women's international lacrosse competitions
2011 in women's sport
2011 in youth sport
Lacrosse in Germany
August 2011 sports events in Europe
21st century in Hanover
2010s in Lower Saxony
2011 Womens